J. Hinrich Wilhelms was a German fishing trawler that was requisitioned by the Kriegsmarine in the Second World War for use as a Vorpostenboot. She served as V 405 J. Hinrich Wilhelms. She was scuttled at Bordeaux, France in August 1944. Post-war, she was refloated and entered French merchant service as Audacieux and later Helios, then Sopite. Converted to a cargo ship in 1961, she was scrapped in 1974.

Description
The engine was made by Deschimag Seebeckwerft, Wesermünde, Germany. It was rated at 123nhp. The engine powered a single screw propeller driven via a low pressure turbine, double reduction gearing and a hydraulic coupling.

History
The ship was built as yard number 521 by Deschimag Seekbeckwerft, Wesermünde for the Hochseefischerei Carl Kämpf Partenreederei, Wesermünde. She was launched on 6 October 1934 and completed on 27 October. The fishing boat registration PG 500 was allocated. She was allocated the Code Letters DFBJ.

J. Hinrich Wilhelms was requisitioned by the Kriegsmarine on 22 September 1939 for use as a vorpostenboot. She was allocated to 4 Vorpostenflotille as V 405 J. Hinrich Wilhelms. On 22 August 1944, she was scuttled at Bordeaux, Gironde, France.

J. Hinrich Wilhelms was refloated post-war, returning to merchant service as the French fishing boat Audacieux. The Code Letters TPYZ were allocated. By the 1950s, she had been renamed Helios. In 1958, she was re-engined with a diesel engine and renamed Sopite. She was now owned by the Cooperative Itsasokoa, Saint-Jean-de-Luz, Gironde. The fishing boat registration BA 1494 was allocated. The engine was a four-stroke single acting engine. It was built by Klöckner-Humboldt-Deutz, Köln. It had 6 cylinders of  diameter by  stroke. In 1961 she was lengthened and converted to a cargo ship. She was scrapped in Spain in the third quarter of 1974.

References

Sources

1934 ships
Ships built in Bremen (state)
Fishing vessels of Germany
Steamships of Germany
World War II merchant ships of Germany
Auxiliary ships of the Kriegsmarine
Maritime incidents in August 1944
World War II shipwrecks in the Atlantic Ocean
Steamships of France
Merchant ships of France